Amanda Septimo is an American politician from the state of New York. A Democrat, Septimo is the Assemblymember for the 84th district of the New York State Assembly, based in the South Bronx; her term began in January 2021.

Early life
Septimo was born and raised in the South Bronx, before attending Vanderbilt University on a full Posse Foundation scholarship  in 2008. With one semester left at Vanderbilt, Septimo moved back to the Bronx to work for Congressman José Serrano. She plans to complete her degree in political science in December 2020.

Career
In 2018, Septimo ran for the New York State Assembly's 84th district, challenging incumbent Carmen Arroyo from the left. Despite receiving high-profile endorsements from 1199SEIU and former City Council Speaker Melissa Mark-Viverito, Septimo lost in the Democratic primary, 63-37%.

Septimo announced a second run against Arroyo in 2020. Before the Democratic primary could be held, however, Arroyo was removed from the ballot for petition fraud, leaving Septimo as the de facto Democratic nominee. Although Arroyo ran in the general election on the Proven Leader Party line, Septimo defeated her easily and began her term the following January.

References

Living people
Politicians from the Bronx
Democratic Party members of the New York State Assembly
Women state legislators in New York (state)
Hispanic and Latino American state legislators in New York (state)
Hispanic and Latino American women in politics
21st-century American politicians
21st-century American women politicians
Candidates in the 2018 United States elections
1991 births